Henry Hennell FRS (c. 1797 – 4 June 1842) was an English chemist.

Hennelll was one of the founders of the Chemical Society of London and was a member of the first elected Council of the Chemical Society. He was elected F.R.S. in 1829. He worked as Chemical Operator at Apothecaries' Hall, London.

In 1825 Michael Faraday discovered that sulfuric acid could absorb large volumes of coal gas. He gave the resulting solution to Hennell, who found in 1826 that it contained "sulphovinic acid" (ethyl hydrogen sulfate). Hennell's finding was a major breakthrough in the synthesis of ethanol and led to major developments in organic chemistry.

Hennell's successor as Chemical Operator at Apothecaries' Hall was Robert Warington.

Selected publications

References

1797 births
1842 deaths
19th-century British chemists
Fellows of the Royal Society